Syedna AbdulQadir Najmuddin bin Syedna Tayyeb Zainuddin (born 18 August 1814 (2nd Ramazan al-Moazzam 1229 AH) – died 11 May 1885) became the 47th Da'i al-Mutlaq of the Dawoodi Bohra sect amid succession disputes.

He was born to Syedna Tayyeb Zainuddin when his father and his father's younger brother Syedna Mohammed Ezzuddin were being trained by Syedna Abdeali Saifuddin to become Da'i al-Mutlaq. His childhood was nurtured by the care and guidance of his father. His father also entrusted him to Syedi Abdeali Imaduddin to be tutored on certain knowledge imparted by the 43rd Da'i al-Mutlaq Syedna Abdeali Saifuddin.

When his father Tayyeb Zainuddin became the 45th Da'i al-Mutlaq, he was seven years old. As he grew up he accompanied his father at all times. His father educated him on the intricacies of becoming a Da'i al-Mutlaq. After the death of his father, the 46th Da'i al-Mutlaq Syedna Mohammed Badruddin educated and guided him.

He was the first Da'i al-Mutlaq whose tenure was the longest amongst all the Da'i al-Mutlaq before him. For a period of more than 46 years he nurtured the members of the Dawoodi Bohra sect with fatherly care and affection. His knowledge and perseverance led the members of the Dawoodi Bohra sect out of a grave crisis that had shaken their very faith and created doubt in their beliefs.

He remained as the Da'i al-Mutlaq until 1885. While he was planning ahead as to how to clear the heavy debts of the Dawoodi Bohra sect and travelling from one place to the other to educate the members of the community, he suddenly came under the influence of an epidemic that was prevalent in Ujjain. He did nass upon Syedna Abdul Husain Husamuddin before important and high-ranking post-holders of the community.

It was in his nature to do everything possible for the happiness of the members of the Dawoodi Bohra sect. So when the members in Ujjain urged him to stay back till he recovered, he stayed back seeing their love and affection for him, knowing very well that by staying back, he would be staying there forever. His mausoleum is at Ujjain.

Early life

Syedna Abdul Qadir Najmuddin was born in Surat, a city in the state of Gujarat, India, where his father had shifted with his family so that he could devote more time in the service of the 43rd Da'i al-Mutlaq Syedna Abdeali Saifuddin. His father wanted to name him as 'Yusuf' but the Syedna Abdeali Saifuddin changed it to 'Abdul Qadir'. The significance of this was realized later when he became the 47th Da'i al-Mutlaq.

Most of his father's time was devoted to the services of 43rd Da'i al-Mutlaq. So in his infancy he remained mostly attached with the family of Da'i al-Mutlaq. He and Syedna Mohammed Budruddin (who was 3 years older), the son of 43rd Da'i al-Mutlaq grew up  together. They were together in almost everything, in their studies, in acquiring knowledge and in their positions in the community.

His father Tayyeb Zainuddin became the 45th Da'i al-Mutlaq of the Dawoodi Bohra sect at the age of 38 years. His father was an efficient administrator and an eminent scholar. With his uncanny foresight he guided the Dawoodi Bohra sect to prosperity and growth. He was also well known amongst the government officials. Authoritative people of other communities also came to seek his advice. All this made the enemies of the Dawoodi Bohra sect so jealous that they tried to assassinate his father more than once. But his father was saved  and protected by the grace of Allah Taala.

For 16 years his father educated him in all aspects of skills and knowledge ranging from general administration to spiritual virtues required for becoming Da'i al-Mutlaq. Acquiring such diverse and valuable skills made him very determined and devoted in his service towards his father and also strengthened him for the major contribution that he had to make when he became the Da'i al-Mutlaq.

Life before Da'i al-Mutlaq

Syedna Abdul Qadir Najmuddin's significant interactions with the members of the Dawoodi Bohra sect began at a very young age as he was closely associated to the family of Da'i al-Mutlaq and later when his father became the 45th Da'i al-Mutlaq.

His father also entrusted Syedi Abdeali Imaduddin to teach him specific knowledge imparted by Syedna Abdeali Saifuddin. He was a fervent learner especially knowledge related to Prophet Muhammad and his progeny. Syedi Abdeali Imaduddin slowly and steadily transferred all the knowledge on to his heart. Syedi Abdeali Imaduddin also taught Syedna Mohammed Badruddin along with him.

They both excelled in their efforts of acquiring knowledge such that his father elevated both of them to the rank of Hadiyyat (rank for learned). Later Syedna Mohammed Badruddin was made Rasul Hudood  (a high-ranking title) and he was made Sadrul Hudood (a high rank below Rasul Hudood).

Later when the Mazoon e Dawat (second highest position in Dawoodi Bohra sect) died his father appointed the Mukasir e Dawat (third highest position) in the position of Mazoon e Dawat and elevated the position of Syedna Mohammed Badruddin to Mukasir e Dawat and made him the Rasul Hudood.

In the year 1837 Syedna Mohammed Badruddin became the 46th Da'i al-Mutlaq and he, forgetting that they were colleagues at one time, served him with the same dedication and humbleness with which he had served his father before.

In the same year 1837 a huge fire broke out in Surat. The fire was raging over many houses, including the house of Da'i al-Mutlaq and other structures. The books of the Dawoodi Bohra sect were in danger of being burnt down. At such a time of catastrophe he devised a plan and made a makeshift platform inside a well. He took all the books and placed them on the platform. The fire raged wildly but passed over the well, saving all the books of the community.  Syedna Mohammed Badruddin later shifted to Pune and sent back him to Surat to reconstruct and repair the burnt-down houses and other structures.

During the restoration process he laid the foundation of Dars us Saify, a school for religious learning on 27th Zilqad ul Haram 1253H. And on the same day after 51 years on 27th Zilqad ul Haram 1305H Syedna Taher Saifuddin was born. A great coincidence or the revelation of a great plan! 

Syedna Mohammed Badruddin did nas upon Syedna Abdul Qadir Najmuddin on 9th Moharram ul Haram 1253H. Again the 46th Da'i al-Mutlaq did nas upon him during Ashura Mubarak in the on 9th Moharram ul Haram 1256H. Thereafter frequently during his sermons and other activities the 46th Da'i al-Mutlaq did nas upon him.

In the year 1840 Syedna Mohammed Badruddin died leaving him at the helm of the Dawoodi Bohra sect that was on the verge of being bombarded by an enemy conspiracy. The Atba-e-Malak sub-sect is founded in 1840 and eventually settles in Nagpur.

Life as Da'i al-Mutlaq

The succession of Syedna Abdul Qadir Najmuddin as the 47th Da'i al-Mutlaq came at a time when the enemies of the Dawoodi Bohra sect were ready to kick up a conspiracy. But the enemies were afraid to do so in the presence of Syedi Abdeali Imaduddin who was the Mukasir e Dawat at that time.

Syedi Abdeali Imaduddin had served four Da'i al-Mutlaq during his lifetime. He had such immense knowledge that he was the teacher of three Da'i al-Mutlaq. He had acquired knowledge from Syedna Abdeali Saifuddin. When Syedna Abdul Qadir Najmuddin went for haj, he had done nas upon Syedi Abdeali Imaduddin. Later Syedi Abdeali Imaduddin died era of Syedna Abdul Qadir Najmuddin and the enemies picked up their weapons against the 47 Da'i al-Mutlaq.

Despite all the incidents of nas done by Syedna Mohammed Badruddin upon him, the enemies of Dawoodi Bohra sect claimed that Syedna Mohammed Badruddin did not do nas upon him.

This claim by the enemies created a chaos and doubt in the minds of some of the members of the community. However to all these claims by the enemies he did not say a word. He just kept on performing his activities as a Da'i al-Mutlaq as if nothing had happened. But the enemies tried very hard to make him say something against them but his patience and complacency was hard to break. This silence by him broke the backbone of the contention of the enemies as it had a two pronged effect:
They did not have anybody to fight with. Just putting on claims without the other party responding is like clapping with one hand. It had one major disadvantage for the enemies, it did not make any noise. And without any noise their contention could not survive for long.

He used this time to travel to the colonies of the members of Dawoodi Bohra sect and educate them about nas thus strengthening the faith of those who were still steadfast on faith and standing by him. And to bring back those members, who were disillusioned by the claims of the enemies, into the folds of the Dawoodi Bohra sect.

By virtue of the knowledge imparted to him he knew exactly who will put an end to this issue. That is the reason why when one of his sons asked him, as to till when he will bear all this. He replied that the fifth Da'i al-Mutlaq from him will solve this matter.  He was referring to the 51st Da'i al-Mutlaq Syedna Taher Saifuddin.

The conspiracy and its effects and measures to educate the members of the community caused a great drain on the funds of the community such that a growing and prospering community began to accumulate debts. And within a period of a few years the Dawoodi Bohra sect now owed a considerable amount of money in dues.

Despite all this he took great care of the members of the community; taking care of their needs, guiding them, solving their problems, teaching them and making their life easier so that they can easily follow the tenents of Islam. He took all their problems and troubles upon himself which was the reason why despite having a wealth of knowledge and great administrative skills he utilised most of his time connecting with the members of the Dawoodi Bohra sect.

His tremendous knowledge and command over different languages can be seen from the fact in Sironge he did a waaz (sermon). In this waaz he used the lisan ud dawat (language of Dawoodi Bohra sect) and Urdu together in such a systematic manner that not even a single word of either language mixed with the other.

His administrative skills can be seen by the fact that despite all the pressures over the community he still kept all the departments functioning and also to accommodate his absence when he has to go on a tour to educate the members of the Dawoodi Bohra sect, so much so that when Allah Taala gave him the opportunity to perform Haj, he tuned up all the functions of the offices of the community to accommodate his absence and became the first Da'i al-Mutlaq to go for Haj since the establishment of the office of Da'i al-Mutlaq.

There is also a famous incident connecting Syedna Abdul Qadir Najmuddin and Maulana Ali. The incident is as follows:
A famous poet wrote a poem on Maulana Ali and intended to offer the same to Maulana Ali. Maulana Ali appeared in the poet's dream and said that, if his (Maulana Ali) Dai Najmuddin accepts the poem, then he (Maulana Ali) will accept it. This poet came in the presence of Syedna Abdul Qadir Najmuddin and told him all that had transpired. He listened to the poem of the poet and accepted it in the name of Maulana Ali and rewarded the writer.

He, as the 47th Da'i al-Mutlaq had elevated the position of his brother Syedna Abdul Husain Husamuddin first to the position of Mukasir e Dawat and then after four years to the position of Mazoon e Dawat. 29 years after this he did nas on his brother when he was in Ujjain. His brother was at Jhalawad at that time. In the nas done before the important post holders of the community he asked those present to tell his brother that he had natured the members of the Dawoodi Bohra sect with great care and affection. When someone asked for water, he had given him milk to drink. He asked his brother to show the same kind of affection. And the members of the Dawoodi Bohra community lost a Father, who loved them like a father, took care of them like a father and also did a will towards his successor to take care of them like a father.

He also has link with Mohammad's family and many noted Dawoodi Bohra Duats including Syedna Qutubuddin Shaheed as indicated below.

References

Further reading
 Gems of History, 

Dawoodi Bohra da'is
1814 births
1885 deaths
19th-century Ismailis